Staro Selo (Old Village) is a small village in the Vratsa Province of northwest Bulgaria. It is situated at the foot of the Balkan Mountains. Staro Selo is a part of Mezdra Municipality. It is also home to the town hall. Staro Selo is near the river Iskar, popular for its angling possibilities. 

The number of inhabitants as of summer 2008 numbered less than 200 due to emigration and is still falling as young people move to nearby towns such as Mezdra, Vratsa or even further away. Many houses are no longer inhabited permanently, having either been abandoned or turned into summer cottages.

External links
www.vratza.co.uk for images of Vratza & Staro Selo.

Villages in Vratsa Province